Raoni Barcelos (born May 1, 1987) is a Brazilian former amateur wrestler and grappler, and current professional mixed martial artist. He is currently signed to the Ultimate Fighting Championship (UFC), where he competes in the bantamweight division. Prior to signing with the UFC, Barcelos was a one-time Resurrection Fighting Alliance (RFA) featherweight champion, and a five-time Brazilian national wrestling champion.

Background 
Barcelos was born in Rio de Janeiro Brazil. He started grappling at the age of five under influence of his father, Laerte Barcelos, who was a Freestyle wrestler in the 1980s, competing for the Brazilian National Wrestling Team, as well as holding a 7th degree coral belt in jiu-jitsu. Barcelos won numerous major titles in his youth, including becoming 5-time national wrestling champion of Brazil, 2-time South-American wrestling champion, and winning 4 world titles in jiu-jitsu at the lower belt classes. After competing few years for the Brazilian National Wrestling Team, Barcelos transitioned to mixed martial arts (MMA) in 2012 at the age of 25.

Mixed martial arts career

Early career
Barcelos started fighting professionally in 2012. He fought under numerous organizations, notably Web Fight Combat, Shooto Brazil, and the
Resurrection Fighting Alliance (RFA), where he was the former RFA featherweight champion.

Ultimate Fighting Championship 

Bacelos was scheduled to make his debut at UFC on October 28, 2017, replacing injured Augusto Mendes. at UFC Fight Night: Brunson vs. Machida against Bostom Salmon. Subsequently, Salmon pulled out of the fight on October 20 citing his own injury. As a result, Barcelos was removed from the card as well.

Barcelos's finally came on July 14, 2018 at UFC Fight Night: dos Santos vs. Ivanov, against Kurt Holobaugh. He won the fight via knockout. This fight earned him the Fight of the Night award.

His next fight came on November 30, 2018 at The Ultimate Fighter: Heavy Hitters against Chris Gutiérrez. He won the fight via technical submission.

Barcelos was scheduled to face Said Nurmagomedov on May 11, 2019 at UFC 237. However, Nurmagomedov withdrew from the bout for undisclosed reason and he was replaced by Carlos Huachin. He won the fight via knockout.

The bout with Nurmagomedov eventually took place on December 21, 2019 at UFC Fight Night: Edgar vs. The Korean Zombie. Barcelos won the fight via unanimous decision.

Barcelos was expected to face Cody Stamann on March 28, 2020 at UFC on ESPN: Ngannou vs. Rozenstruik. Due to the COVID-19 pandemic, the event was eventually postponed .

Barcelos faced Khalid Taha on November 7, 2020 at UFC on ESPN: Santos vs. Teixeira. He won the fight via unanimous decision. This fight earned him the Fight of the Night award.

Barcelos was expected to face Merab Dvalishvili on December 5, 2020 at UFC on ESPN 19. However, Barcelos was removed from the contest due to a medical suspension related to his latest bout on November 7.

Barcelos was scheduled to face Raphael Assunção on February 27, 2021 at UFC Fight Night 186. However, Assunção pulled out of the fight in early February for undisclosed reasons. UFC newcomer Marcelos Rojo was named as the replacement. Subsequently, Bancelos was removed from the fight on February 22 after testing positive for COVID-19.

Barcelos faced Timur Valiev on June 26, 2021 at UFC Fight Night: Gane vs. Volkov.  Despite knocking Valiev down several times, he lost the fight via majority decision. This fight earned him the Fight of the Night award.

Barcelos was scheduled to face Trevin Jones on December 18, 2021 at UFC Fight Night 199. However Jones withdrew from the fight for undisclosed reasons and he was replaced by Victor Henry. The pairing was then cancelled just hours before taking place due to COVID-19 protocols, and rescheduled to meet on January 22, 2022 at UFC 270. Barcelos lost the fight via unanimous decision.

Barcelos faced Trevin Jones on October 1, 2022 at UFC Fight Night: Dern vs. Yan. Barcelos won the fight by unanimous decision (30-25, 30-27, 30-27) in a one-sided fight.

Barcelos faced Umar Nurmagomedov on January 14, 2022, at UFC Fight Night 217. He lost the fight via knockout in the first round.

Championships and accomplishments

Mixed martial arts
Ultimate Fighting Championship
Fight of the Night (Three times) 
Resurrection Fighting Alliance
RFA Featherweight Championship (One time)
Two successful title defenses

Wrestling
5-time Brazilian Wrestling Champion
2-time South-American Wrestling Champion

Brazilian Jiu Jitsu 
Lineage: Mitsuyo Maeda > Carlos Gracie > Reyson Gracie > Osvaldo Alves > Laerte Barcelos > Raoni Barcelos
Brazilian Nogi Champion (2009 black)
World Champion – IBJJF (2002 blue, 2003 blue, 2006 purple)
World Cup Champion – CBJJO (2005)
Brazilian National Champion (2004 & 2005 blue, 2006 purple)
Portuguese National Champion (2010)
Brazilian National Silver Medallist (2002, 2003)

Mixed martial arts record 

|-
|Loss
|align=center|17–4
|Umar Nurmagomedov
|KO (body kick and punch)
|UFC Fight Night: Strickland vs. Imavov
|
|align=center|1
|align=center|4:40
|Las Vegas, Nevada, United States
|-
|Win
|align=center|17–3
|Trevin Jones
|Decision (unanimous)
|UFC Fight Night: Dern vs. Yan
|
|align=center|3
|align=center|5:00
|Las Vegas, Nevada, United States
|
|-
|Loss
|align=center|16–3
|Victor Henry
|Decision (unanimous)
|UFC 270
|
|align=center|3
|align=center|5:00
|Anaheim, California, United States
|
|-
|Loss
|align=center|16–2
|Timur Valiev
|Decision (majority)
|UFC Fight Night: Gane vs. Volkov 
|
|align=center|3
|align=center|5:00
|Las Vegas, Nevada, United States
| 
|-
|Win
|align=center|16–1
|Khalid Taha
|Decision (unanimous)
|UFC on ESPN: Santos vs. Teixeira
|
|align=center|3
|align=center|5:00
|Las Vegas, Nevada, United States
|
|-
|Win
|align=center|15–1
|Said Nurmagomedov
|Decision (unanimous)
|UFC Fight Night: Edgar vs. The Korean Zombie 
|
|align=center|3
|align=center|5:00
|Busan, South Korea
|   
|-
|Win
|align=center|14–1
|Carlos Huachin
|TKO (elbows and punches)
|UFC 237 
|
|align=center|2
|align=center|4:49
|Rio de Janeiro, Brazil
|
|-
|Win
|align=center|13–1
|Chris Gutiérrez
|Submission (rear-naked choke)
|The Ultimate Fighter: Heavy Hitters Finale 
|
|align=center|2
|align=center|4:12
|Las Vegas, Nevada, United States
|
|-
|Win
|align=center|12–1
|Kurt Holobaugh
|KO (punches)
|UFC Fight Night: dos Santos vs. Ivanov 
|
|align=center|3
|align=center|1:23
|Boise, Idaho, United States
|
|-
|Win
|align=center|11–1
|Dan Moret
|KO (punches)
|RFA 45
|
|align=center|2
|align=center|0:51
|Prior Lake, Minnesota, United States
|
|-
|Win
|align=center|10–1
|Bobby Moffett
|Decision (unanimous)
|RFA 39
|
|align=center|5
|align=center|5:00
|Hammond, Indiana, United States
|
|-
|Win
|align=center|9–1
|Ricky Musgrave
|Decision (unanimous)
|RFA 29
|
|align=center|5
|align=center|5:00
|Sioux Falls, South Dakota, United States
|
|-
|Win
|align=center|8–1
|Jamal Parks
|KO (punches)
|RFA 23
|
|align=center|1
|align=center|2:31
|Costa Mesa, California, United States
|
|-
|Loss
|align=center|7–1
|Mark Dickman
|Submission (rear-naked choke)
|RFA 14
|
|align=center|2
|align=center|2:06
|Cheyenne, Wyoming, United States
|
|-
|Win
|align=center|7–0
|Tyler Toner
|Decision (unanimous)
|RFA 11
|
|align=center|3
|align=center|5:00
|Broomfield, Colorado, United States
|
|-
|Win
|align=center|6–0
|Erinaldo dos Santos Rodrigues
|KO (flying knee and punches)
|Webfight Combat 2
|
|align=center|1
|align=center|3:25
|Rio de Janeiro, Brazil
|
|-
|Win
|align=center|5–0
|João Herdy Jr.
|TKO (punches)
|Web Fight Combat
|
|align=center|2
|align=center|0:00
|Rio de Janeiro, Brazil
|
|-
|Win
|align=center|4–0
|Jorge Rodrigues Silva
|Decision (unanimous)
|Shooto Brazil 34
|
|align=center|3
|align=center|5:00
|Brasilia, Brazil
|
|-
|Win
|align=center|3–0
|Fabricio Batista
|TKO (punches)
|Shooto Brazil 32
|
|align=center|1
|align=center|0:21
|Rio de Janeiro, Brazil
|
|-
|Win
|align=center|2–0
|Gilmar Silva Milhorance
|Submission (guillotine choke)
|Shooto Brazil 29
|
|align=center|1
|align=center|1:16
|Rio de Janeiro, Brazil
|
|-
|Win
|align=center|1–0
|Vitor Riso
|TKO (doctor stoppage)
|Shooto Brazil 28
|
|align=center|1
|align=center|5:00
|Rio de Janeiro, Brazil
|
|-
|}

See also 
 List of current UFC fighters
 List of male mixed martial artists

References

External links 
 
 

Living people
1987 births
Sportspeople from Rio de Janeiro (city)
Featherweight mixed martial artists
Mixed martial artists utilizing freestyle wrestling
Mixed martial artists utilizing Brazilian jiu-jitsu
Brazilian practitioners of Brazilian jiu-jitsu
People awarded a black belt in Brazilian jiu-jitsu
Ultimate Fighting Championship male fighters
Brazilian male sport wrestlers